Monica Sex (also spelled Monika Sex) is an Israeli alternative rock band.

History

Formation and Wounds and Kisses (1993–1995)
The band was formed in 1992 in Tel Aviv, by Yali Sobol as vocalist and guitarist, Peter Roth as guitarist, Yossi Hamami on bass, and Shahar Even Tzur as drummer and vocalist. It was named after a famous female bass player from a 1980's punk rock band, "Hot Killer".

Sobol, the leader of the group, wrote a few songs, and shortly the band began to perform. After three years of gigging Wounds and Kisses (the album was released in 1995 and reached gold album within 5 months. Four singles from the album received significant airplay on the radio.

US and break-up (1995–1996)
After Wounds and Kisses, Yossi Hamami wanted to play more fusion, and left the band. A while later, the band tried its luck in the United States and performed as a trio with Roth now on bass guitar. They came back to Israel for one show as an opening act for Sonic Youth and returned. They recorded a few songs in English, but after a year they couldn't adapt to the lifestyle in the US and decided to break up. Sobol came back, Roth returned to Israel and became popular among several influential bands in the country, playing and recording with them. Drummer Even-Tzur stayed in the States.

Reunion, Open Relations, Pets and hiatus (2000–2010)
In 2000 Monica Sex decided to re-group and make their second album Open Relations (Yahasim Ptuchim). With the organist Eldad Guetta playing on the album and later joining the band, they recorded 12 new songs, mostly written by Sobol. Again, many songs became hit singles, and the album got the same commercial reception as the last one did six years earlier.

After two years Pets (Hayot Mahmad), their third album was released. After supporting the album with a series of live shows, the band went again on a hiatus, and between 2004–2010 rarely appeared or performed live, only performing in special event like the Israeli Independence Day "Rock Atzmaut" annual show.

Melody and renewed activity (2010–present)
In mid-2010, the band members announced that after many years of minimal activity both live and in the studio, which resulted in only a few live shows a year, and jamming in the studio, the band will go into the studio with the intention to write material for a new full-length studio album.

In October 2010, it was announced that the band had finished recording their latest album Melody (Mangina), and the first single "The Dress from Madrid" (Ha-simla mi Madrid) was released to the radio.

On 19 December 2010, the second single "Mangina" (Mangina) was released. The full album was released on 24 February 2011, in a special release show at the Hangar 11 in Tel Aviv.

Band members

Current members
 Yali Sobol – vocals, guitar (1993–1996, 2000–present)
 Peter Roth – guitar, backing vocals (1993–1995, 2000–2001, 2009–present), bass (1995–1996, 2001–2009)
 Shahar Even Tzur – drums, vocals (1993–1996, 2000–present)
 Seffy Efrati – bass (2009–present)

Former members
 Eldad Guetta – keyboards, organ (1993–1995), bass (2000–2001)
 Yossi Hamami – bass, backing vocals (1993–1995)

Seffy Efrati

Seffy Efrati (born 28 November 1975) is an Israeli musician. He is the bassist in the band of Israeli rock star Aviv Geffen. In the past he was in the Israeli-British art rock band Blackfield with Geffen and Porcupine Tree leader Steven Wilson. Efrati, a left-handed bass player, plays a Spector Bass that was designed for him by the manufacturers.

Efrati appears on stage regularly in his native country, and has appeared on many Israeli pop and rock recordings, including records by Geffen, Hemi Rudner, Ninette Tayeb, Daniel Salomon, Ram Orion and numerous alternative rock Tel Aviv bands.

In 2008, Efrati co-starred in the mini-series "Ta'ase li Yeled" (Hebrew: תעשה לי ילד), directed by Yuval Schafferman for Israeli channel HOT3.

In 2010, he joined Israeli alternative rock band Monica Sex.

See also
Music of Israel

References

External links
 
 
 

Israeli alternative rock groups
Musical groups disestablished in 1996
Musical groups established in 1993
Musical groups reestablished in 2000
1993 establishments in Israel